R16 may refer to:

Roads 
 R16 road (Ghana) 
 R-16 regional road (Montenegro)

Vehicles 
 R16 (New York City Subway car)
 Lublin R-XVI, a 1932 Polish passenger and air ambulance aircraft
 Renault 16, a family hatchback
 Romano R.16, a high wing monoplane
 , a destroyer of the Royal Canadian Navy
 , a aircraft carrier of the Royal Navy
 , a submarine of the United States Navy

Other uses 
 R-16 (missile), a Soviet intercontinental ballistic missile
 R16 (Rodalies de Catalunya), a regional rail line in Catalonia, Spain
 Aika R-16: Virgin Mission, an anime OVA series
 R-16 Korea, an international b-boy competition
 R16: Explosive when mixed with oxidising substances, a risk phrase
 Small nucleolar RNA R16